Homeobox protein DBX1, also known as developing brain homeobox protein 1, is a protein that in humans is encoded by the DBX1 gene. The DBX1 gene is a transcription factor gene that is pivotal in interneuron differentiation in the ventral spinal cord. 

The spinal interneurons V0 and V1 are derived from progenitor domains that are differentiated by the expression of homeodomain proteins DBX1 and DBX2. DBX1 is spatially restricted and has a critical role in establishing the distinction of V0 and V1 neuronal fate. In DBX1 mutant mice, neural progenitors fail to generate V0 interneurons and instead gave rise to interneurons expressing V1 characteristics, such as their transcription factor profile, neurotransmitter phenotype, migratory pattern, and aspects of their axonal trajectory, suggesting that this single homeodomain transcription factor coordinates many of the differentiated properties of one class of interneurons generated in the ventral spinal cord. 

V0 and V1 interneurons are thought to be critical in the role of rhythmic breathing, after using a neonatal mouse model. Destruction of these DBX1 neurons in the pre-Botzinger complex showed an impaired respiratory rhythm as well as a decreased magnitude of motor output activity.

References